The 1952 SMU Mustangs football team represented Southern Methodist University (SMU) as a member of the Southwest Conference (SWC) during the 1952 college football season. Led by Rusty Russell in his third and final season as head coach, the Mustangs compiled an overall record of 4–5–1 with a mark of 3–2–1 in conference play, placing third in the SWC. SMU played home games at the Cotton Bowl in Dallas. Bill Forester was the team captain.

Schedule

References

SMU
SMU Mustangs football seasons
SMU Mustangs football